Sterling Hill is a mountain in Sussex County, New Jersey. It is part of the Pimple Hills.

Name
The mountain derives its name from Lord Stirling, who owned the land in the eighteenth century, on which he operated a zinc mine.

See also
Sterling Hill Mining Museum

References 

Mountains of Sussex County, New Jersey
Mountains of New Jersey